Hemistomia beaumonti is a species of minute freshwater snails with an operculum, aquatic gastropod molluscs or micromolluscs in the family Tateidae. This species is endemic to Lord Howe Island, Australia.

References

External links

Hemistomia
Gastropods of Australia
Gastropods described in 1982
Taxonomy articles created by Polbot